Saath Rahega Always is an Indian television series based on all matters within the premises of college from typical college atmosphere, mature girl, funky and modish dude to the jealous or scheming friend. The show premiered in India on Sahara One on 28 November 2005.

Plot
Peehu, Krish, Soham, and Palakh are longtime best friends despite their dissimilar personalities and goals. They spend most of their time in the college canteen.

Cast
 Neha Marda as Pihu Bhargav
 Karan Rai / Sachin Verma as Krish Oberoi
 Karan Veer Mehra as Soham Mehta
 Shilpa Shinde as Pihu Bhargav
 Rishina Kandhari as Palak
 Amit Dua as Lalit
 Rahul Lohani as Nitin
 Jatin Shah as Shikhar
 Girish Jain as Avi

References

Sahara One original programming
Indian drama television series
2005 Indian television series debuts
2006 Indian television series endings